Columbia Hall may refer to:

Columbia Hall (Dannebrog, Nebraska), a historic building
Columbia Hall, a hotel and opera house in Stone City, Iowa
Columbia Hall, a building at the University of Oregon
Columbia Hall, commonly known as Paresis Hall, a bar and brothel in New York City managed by James T. Ellison
Columbia Hall, a contributing building in Stephens College South Campus Historic District, in Missouri
Columbia Hall, a recording studio in Berlin Encores and New Songs
Columbia Hall, a building at University of South Carolina

See also
Columbia Building (disambiguation)
Columbia City Hall (South Carolina)